Thomas Simpson Camidge (2 February 1828 – 19 December 1913) was an organist and composer based in England.

Life

He was born on 2 February 1828, the son of John Camidge, Organist of York Minster.

He was educated at St Peter's School, York, and at the Leipzig Conservatoire from 1846.

On 29 June 1852 he married Mary Catherine Norrison. His eldest son John Henry Norrison Camidge also became an organist.

He spent the last few years of his life in Oystermouth and died in Mumbles on 19 December 1913.

Appointments

Acting Organist of York Minster 1850 - 1859
Organist of All Saints' Church, Pavement, York 1851 - 1856
Organist of Christ Church, Swindon 1859 - 1864
Organist of St. John's Church, Ousebridge, York 1865 - 1882
Organist of Hexham Abbey 1882 - 1889
Organist of Swindon Parish Church 1889 - 1890
Organist of All Saints' Church, Swansea 1890 - 1899

Compositions

His compositions include: 
Morning and Evening Services in A and C
Three Anthems
Twenty psalm chants

References

1828 births
1913 deaths
English organists
British male organists
English composers
People educated at St Peter's School, York
19th-century English musicians
19th-century British male musicians